Westgate Oxford (formerly the Westgate Centre) is a major shopping centre in Oxford city centre, England, that was extensively remodelled and extended between 2016 and 2017.

The original centre was built between 1970 and 1972, designed by Douglas Murray and built by Taylor Woodrow. The centre was closed in February 2016 for comprehensive redevelopment, and reopened on Tuesday 24 October 2017.

Location
Westgate is at the west end of Queen Street, facing onto Bonn Square. The West Gate into the city of Oxford stood at the adjacent junction of Castle Street, Norfolk Street and Paradise Street until the mid-17th century, having stood there since the Saxon period, and the shopping centre is named after this former gateway into the city. The site is bordered by Bonn Square, Castle Street, Norfolk Street, Oxpens Road, Old Greyfriars Street, Roger Bacon Lane and St Ebbes Street, and is adjacent to the medieval Oxford Castle quarter to the northwest.

History
The Westgate Shopping Centre opened in 1972, and was originally owned by Oxford City Council.  The centre included branches of Selfridges, Sainsbury's and C&A. The central library was also moved to the centre from the Town Hall, being opened by Queen Elizabeth, the Queen Mother, on 31 October 1973. Queen Elizabeth II and the Duke of Edinburgh visited in 1976.

The centre was sold in the 1980s to private owners; in 1986, they refurbished it, at a cost of £3 million.  Two years later, an early proposal was made to extend the centre by its then owners, CIN Properties and Arrowcroft, but did not proceed. The large Selfridges, latterly a branch of Lewis's and then Allders, closed in 2005, and became a Primark in 2006.

Redevelopment
Plans for the redevelopment of the Westgate area were originally published in 2004. Over the next several years, the plan underwent several rounds of consultation and inquiry. The eventual plan was adopted in the early 2010s, and development permission granted in November 2014. Work on the development started in early 2015, and the original centre closed in 2016.

The developer is the Westgate Oxford Alliance, a joint venture between the Crown Estate and Land Securities Group Plc.

The new centre has almost  of retail, restaurant and leisure space including a new John Lewis, a rooftop dining terrace with views across Oxford's skyline, and a five screen Curzon Cinema. According to Oxford City Council, "the £500 million redevelopment of the Westgate Centre is a key part of the regeneration of Oxford city centre, creating high quality buildings designed by world-class architects and providing more than 3,400 new full-time equivalent jobs."
The new centre reopened on 24 October 2017.

2017 facilities
The 2017 Westgate has features and facilities including:

Over 100 new shops including a John Lewis department store and various high street retailers
Cafés and restaurants
Leisure facilities including a cinema
New landscaped walkway along Castle Mill Stream
Two new public squares
New pedestrian routes through the site
Re-routed bus lane and new taxi drop-off / pick up
Cycle parking
Two-storey basement car park of between 900 and 1100 spaces
59 new one- and two-bedroom flats

Criticism

Archeological remains
When the original centre was built in the 1970s, excavations for the service basements destroyed archaeological remains of part of medieval Oxford.

During the 2015–2017 redevelopment, Oxford Archaeology, working in conjunction with the developers and contractors, carried out architectural investigations into "the extensive remains of the medieval Greyfriars friary (AD 1244–1538)", with stone foundations, wooden and other artefacts, and part of a medieval tiled floor being discovered. The tiled floor is now on display in the centre. Remains from the excavations were temporarily displayed in the Museum of Oxford.

Urban planning and architecture
A local campaign group, called "Oxford Against Westgate Expansion", was formed to oppose the proposed redevelopment, holding a public meeting at the Oxford Town Hall on 28 February 2008.  At the meeting, protestors voiced concerns about increased traffic and potential risk of flooding from the construction of an underground car park.  A second meeting was held on 13 March that year.

There have also been concerns over the imposing and largely windowless wall at the southwest of the latest redevelopment on Oxpens Road by conservationists, including the Oxford Civic Society.

Queen Street closure
Oxfordshire County Council sought to ban buses from using Queen Street, which passes the Westgate Centre's main entrance. The council alleged that the increase in pedestrian numbers generated by the enlarged shopping centre would mean that it would no longer be safe for buses to use the street. The Secretary of State for Transport, Chris Grayling, declined the application, pointing out that the council had failed to provide evidence of its claim.

See also
 St Ebbes
 Castle Street, Oxford
 Museum of Oxford

References

External links
 Westgate Oxford

1972 establishments in England
Shopping malls established in 1972
Shopping centres in Oxford
Town Gates in England
Former gates